Beatrice Mary Grenville Freeman-Grenville, 12th Lady Kinloss (18 August 1922 – 30 September 2012) was a British peer.

The eldest of the three daughters of Luis Chandos Francis Temple Morgan-Grenville and Katherine Beatrice MacKenzie Jackman, she was educated at Ravenscroft School Eastbourne. She was the senior heir-general to Edward Seymour, Viscount Beauchamp, the only son of Lady Catherine Grey.

She succeeded to the title Lady Kinloss on the death in 1944 of her grandmother, Mary Morgan-Grenville, 11th Lady Kinloss. She married Dr Greville Stewart Parker Freeman (later Freeman-Grenville) in 1950; they had one son and two daughters:
 The Hon. Bevil David Stewart Chandos Freeman-Grenville, Master of Kinloss (1953–2012); presumably named for his ancestor Bevil Grenville
 Teresa Mary Nugent Freeman-Grenville, 13th Lady Kinloss (born 1957)
 The Hon. Hester Josephine Anne Freeman-Grenville (born 1960), married Peter Haworth in 1984 and has three sons.

She sat as an independent crossbencher peer in the House of Lords from the implementation of the Peerage Act 1963, which allowed women peers in their own right to sit in the House, until the implementation of the House of Lords Act 1999, which removed all but 92 hereditary peers. She served on the House of Lords Committee on European Communities from 1990 to 1992. She was unsuccessful in her bid to be elected as one of the retained 92 hereditary peers, coming 38th in a field of 79 candidates for 28 seats reserved for Crossbenchers.

The 12th Lady Kinloss died on 30 September 2012. She was succeeded by her daughter, Teresa Freeman-Grenville, 13th Lady Kinloss.

References

External links
 Ms Beatrice Freeman-Grenville, Hansard 1803–2005; retrieved 6 December 2011.

1922 births
2012 deaths
Mary
Hereditary women peers
Mary
Place of birth missing
Female heirs apparent
Kinloss